Stepanovka is a rural locality (a khutor) in Grishevskoye Rural Settlement, Podgorensky District, Voronezh Oblast, Russia. The population was 196 as of 2010. There are 3 streets.

Geography 
Stepanovka is located 14 km northwest of Podgorensky (the district's administrative centre) by road. Opyt is the nearest rural locality.

References 

Rural localities in Podgorensky District